Fiesta Restaurant Group is a Dallas, Texas-based restaurant chain, primarily owning Pollo Tropical locations in Florida. After spinning off of Carrols Restaurant Group in 2012, it is now traded on NASDAQ as FRGI.

Fiesta's 2019 revenue was $661 million and employs over 10,000 people.

History
In 2011, Carrols Restaurant Corp. announced its intentions of separating its Hispanic brands and Burger King restaurant business into two separate public companies. The Hispanic brands were placed under Fiesta Restaurant Group, the new subsidiary of Carrols Restaurant Corp. Fiesta Restaurant Group companies had a combined revenue of $439.1 million in 2010. In August 2011, Carrols Restaurant Corp named Tim Taft the CEO of Fiesta Restaurant Group, succeeding Fiesta chairman Alan Vituli. By the time the separation of the brands was complete in 2011, Fiesta Restaurant Group saw an 8.2 percent revenue increase for the year and finished at $475.0 million in 2011. In April 2012, Carrols Restaurant Corp agreed to allow Fiesta Restaurant Group to spin-off with Taco Cabana and Pollo Tropical. The spin-off was completed on May 8, 2012.

Fiesta Restaurant Group, Inc went public on NASDAQ under the symbol FRGI on May 8, 2012.

As of 2014, Fiesta Restaurant Group continued to own Taco Cabana. As of January 3, 2016, Fiesta had 162 company-owned and six franchised Taco Cabana restaurants. In February 2016, Fiesta announced that it would split its two brands, Taco Cabana and Pollo Tropical, into two separate companies. Over the next year or two, it was announced that all of Taco Cabana's stock would be distributed to Fiesta shareholders, and that Fiesta would be renamed Pollo Tropical. The plan to separate Pollo Tropical and Taco Cabana was dropped in September 2016. At the time, there were plans to open up to 10 new Taco Cabana restaurants in Texas, adding to the 164 company-owned stores and 7 franchised ones. In 2017, the store saw some declines in sales in the second quarter, which Fiesta attributed to less marketing. As of July 2017, it had 176 Taco Cabana stores. On January 14, 2020, it was announced that Fiesta Restaurant Group will be closing 19 Texas Taco Cabanas immediately, citing - “eliminate all stores with significant losses".

During the COVID-19 pandemic, Fiesta received $15 million in federally backed small business loans from J.P. Morgan as part of the Paycheck Protection Program. The company received scrutiny over these loans, which were aimed at small businesses. A week later, the company returned the money.

In July 2021, Fiesta Restaurant Group announced that it had agreed to sell all outstanding equity of Taco Cabana Inc. to an affiliate of Yadav Enterprises for a cash purchase price of $85M to fully repay the company's approximately $74.6 million outstanding term loan borrowings.

References

External links
 

Restaurants in San Antonio
Economy of the Southwestern United States
Regional restaurant chains in the United States
Fast-food chains of the United States
Fast-food Mexican restaurants